Sinohelicoprion ("Chinese spiral jaw") is an extinct genus of helicoprinid eugeneodontid fish that lived during the late Permian 254 to 252 million years ago and became extinct during the Permian-Triassic extinction event.

It was first named and classified by H. T. Liu and M. N. Chang in 1963.

Gallery

References 

Agassizodontidae
Permian fish of Asia